Islam Bozbayev (born 11 June 1991 in Temirtau) is a Kazakh judoka who won the bronze medal in the men's under 81 kg class at the 2010 Asian Games.  He competed in the same division at the 2012 Summer Olympics.

References

External links
 

1991 births
Living people
People from Temirtau
Kazakhstani male judoka
Judoka at the 2012 Summer Olympics
Olympic judoka of Kazakhstan
Judoka at the 2010 Asian Games
Judoka at the 2018 Asian Games
Asian Games silver medalists for Kazakhstan
Asian Games medalists in judo
Medalists at the 2010 Asian Games
Medalists at the 2018 Asian Games
Judoka at the 2020 Summer Olympics
20th-century Kazakhstani people
21st-century Kazakhstani people